Jaimal Rathore (1507–1568) was the Rathore ruler of Merta. He was cousin of the Hindu saint Mirabai and became the ruler of Merta after the death of his father, Rao Veeram Dev. His father was perceived as the strongest king of the east in his time. The Amar Kavya records that Udai Singh II granted Badnor along with 210 villages to Rao Jaimal. In 1553, Jaimal resisted falling under the chakri (service relationship) of Maldeo of Marwar.

The Siege of Chittorgarh
In 1567, when Akbar encamped outside Chittorgarh, in hopes of conquering the fortress, the ruler of Mewar, Udai Singh II, fled to the Aravali hills alongside his family, and left the fortress in charge of 8,000 soldiers and 1,000 musketeers, who were in command of Jaimal and Patta. Jaimal died in Chittorgarh on 22 February 1568 by a musket shot fired by Akbar himself. This turned the tide of battle in the Siege of Chittorgarh and the Rajputs' morale decreased. Jaimal's name is commonly mentioned with his partner leader of chittor, Patta. These two were given the command of the army when Udai Singh, along with the royal family, had to leave the fort and go to the hills. Their attempts to repulse the Mughal Emperor himself was such that Akbar himself ordered the construction of their statues outside his fort in Agra to honour their courage.

His son, Ramdas Rathore went on to fight against the Mughals in the Battle of Haldighati, where he was slain and killed by Jagannath Kachhwa of Amer.

In popular culture
 2013-2015: Bharat Ka Veer Putra – Maharana Pratap, broadcast by Sony, Jaimal was portrayed by Ved Thappar.

References

1507 births
1568 deaths
Rajasthani people

Mewar